In September 1891 the Elections and Qualifications Committee conducted a re-count of the 1891 Canterbury election. There were 4 seats available. Joseph Carruthers had been comfortably re-elected at the head of the poll with 7,231 votes, 19.8%.  The following 4 candidates were separated by 105 votes, with John Wheeler defeating James Eve for the final seat with a margin of 5 votes. The next best candidate, John Grant was a further 487 behind, with 3,857 votes, 10.6%.

The committee declared that John Wheeler had not been elected the member for Canterbury, however no by-election was conducted. Instead the committee declared that James Eve based on its own count of the result.

Dates

Result

|-
|  | 
	| colspan="2"   |  gain 1 from 
The Elections and Qualifications Committee conducted a re-count of the 1891 Canterbury election and declared that John Wheeler had not been elected the member for Canterbury. No by-election was conducted, instead the committee declared that James Eve had been elected.

See also
Electoral results for the district of Canterbury
List of New South Wales state by-elections

Notes

References

1891 elections in Australia
New South Wales state by-elections
1890s in New South Wales